"Little Man" is a hit single by the pop duo Sonny and Cher released in 1966 from their third studio album In Case You're In Love. It became one of their biggest hits, reaching number 1 on the singles charts in various European countries.

Reception
This single became the duo's greatest chart success since "I Got You Babe" in the UK, and became one of only three top ten hits for the duo there. Sonny & Cher duo recordings in the first half of 1966 started performing less well on the charts ("Have I Stayed Too Long" peaked at #49 in April 1966). In September the duo embarked on an ambitious tour of Europe, but without a single to promote. While in London they recorded the vocals for the backing track they had brought along and it gave them their biggest hit in Europe: "Little Man". Its continental flavor with Greek and gypsy overtones struck an immediate chord, and its popularity was boosted by numerous television appearances all over Europe. In The Netherlands, Sweden and Belgium it shot to the number 1 position in record time and stayed there for weeks on end. It was also decided then to release Cher's version of "Sunny" (from her third solo album) in Europe, in competition with Bobby Hebb's original and Georgie Fame's jazzy cover. "Sunny" rose to number 2 in the Netherlands (giving them the number 1 and 2 slot simultaneously at one point) and 4 in Sweden. Sonny & Cher then recorded their own French and Italian ("Piccolo ragazzo") versions. While "Little Man" was the high point of Sonny & Cher's singles in Europe it missed out on the top twenty in their native America reaching number 21.

Charts

Weekly charts

Year-end charts

Decade-end charts

Certifications

|}

Cover versions
In Italy and France the singer Dalida recorded Italian and French versions ("Petit homme") of the song, finding success with both renditions. Milva and I Rogers also had a go in Italy with their cover of the song. The big success in France was the inspiration for an inspired cover by singer Erick Saint-Laurent entitled "Les enfants qui jouent" (French lyrics by Monty).

In 1968 in Québec, Tony Roman and Nanette Workman  has made another French cover "Petit Homme".

Revival
The song was used in late 2015 and early 2016 in a television commercial for Amazon Prime featuring a miniature pony.

References

Sonny & Cher songs
1966 singles
Number-one singles in Norway
1966 songs
Songs written by Sonny Bono